Te Whare Wānanga o Awanuiārangi is a wānanga (indigenous tertiary education provider) based in Whakatāne, New Zealand, established in 1991 by Ngāti Awa.

Faculty

 Taiarahia Black
 Mera Lee-Penehira
 Te Kani Kingi
 Ron Taiapa
 Linda Tuhiwai Smith

See also
 Te Wānanga o Raukawa
 Te Wānanga o Aotearoa

External links 
 

Te Whare Wānanga o Awanuiārangi
Ngāti Awa
Educational institutions established in 1991
Whakatāne
1991 establishments in New Zealand
Māori universities and colleges in New Zealand